Giordano is both a given name and a surname of Italian origin. It is the Italian version of Jordan.

People with the surname Giordano
Al Giordano, American journalist and political activist
Andrea Giordano (born 1976), Argentine gymnast
Bruno Giordano, Italian footballer
Bruno Giordano, Italian politician
Charles Giordano, United States keyboards and accordion player
Christian Giordano, Swiss anthropologist
Dick Giordano (1932–2010), American comic book artist and editor
Daniele Giordano, Italian footballer
Fabio Giordano, Italian footballer
Filippa Giordano, Italian crossover singer
Gus Giordano, American jazz dancer, teacher, and choreographer
Henry Giordano (1914–2003), American pharmacist and federal agent
JoAnn Giordano, American textile artist and curator who has exhibited since 1977
Laura Giordano, Italian lyric soprano
Lou Giordano, record producer and recording engineer
Luca Giordano, 17th-century artist
Mark Giordano, Canadian professional ice hockey defenceman
Matt Giordano, safety for the Indianapolis Colts of the NFL
Matteo Giordano, Italian footballer
Michele Giordano, Cardinal Archbishop emeritus of Naples, Italy
Paolo Giordano, Italian writer
Riccardo Giordano (born 1970), Italian windsurfer
Tyrone Giordano (born 1976), deaf American actor
Umberto Giordano (1867–1948), Italian composer
William J. Giordano (1919–1993), New York politician

Geographical distribution of the surname
As of 2014, 60.3% of all known bearers of the surname Giordano were residents of Italy (frequency 1:759), 17.3% of the United States (1:15,615), 9.4% of Argentina (1:3,390), 4.3% of France (1:11,633) and 3.3% of Brazil (1:46,874).

In Italy, the frequency of the surname was higher than national average (1:759) in the following regions:
 1. Campania (1:242)
 2. Basilicata (1:298)
 3. Piedmont (1:325)
 4. Calabria (1:428)
 5. Liguria (1:456)
 6. Sicily (1:494)

In Argentina, the frequency of the surname was higher than national average (1:3,390) in the following provinces:
 1. Córdoba Province (1:1,176)
 2. Santa Fe Province (1:1,917)
 3. San Luis Province (1:2,570)
 4. Buenos Aires (1:2,696)
 5. Mendoza Province (1:3,009)

People with the given name Giordano
Giordano Bruno, 16th-century philosopher
Giordano Corsi (1908–1958), Italian footballer
Giordano Orsini (disambiguation), several people
Giordano Vitale (1633–1711), mathematician

See also
Jordan (disambiguation)
Jordanus
Jourdain

References

Italian masculine given names
Italian-language surnames